John Allan (20 January 1911 – 21 October 1987) was a Scottish cricketer, who played for Scotland once in First-class cricket in 1951.

References 

1911 births
Scottish cricketers
1987 deaths